"Sam Hall" is a science fiction novelette by Poul Anderson, first published in Astounding Science Fiction in August 1953.

Setting

The story is set in a 21st-century in which the United States has descended into totalitarianism (while retaining the outward forms of republican government) in the aftermath of two additional world wars. Conventional wisdom (as relayed by the story's viewpoint character) maintains that the US loss in World War III had forced the nation to become a "garrison state" in order to prevail in World War IV, but it is not specified who the combatants in either of these conflicts had been; the USSR is never mentioned in the story (aside from the suggestive detail that Moscow, Idaho has been renamed to "Americatown.")
 
The story's World War IV may be identical with a conflict ten years prior to the events of "Sam Hall," in which China had carried out "abortive" nuclear attacks on several American cities; the viewpoint character comes to suspect this may have been a false flag conducted by the US regime itself. At some point prior to that, the US had also fought and won a war against Brazil; the viewpoint character is certain this was a pretext to obtain basing rights and minerals.

At the point when the story takes place, the US regime appears to exercise some form of security hegemony over the entire rest of the Earth, with the Anglosphere nations enjoying some form of autonomy. The US also has exclusive control over human settlement of the Solar System; the most important of these is a pre-Mariner habitable Venus, which hosts thorium mines operated by conscript labor under inhuman conditions, though there are colonies on Mars, the Moon, and the Jovian satellites as well.

Synopsis

Major Thornberg is a technical officer in command of an underground base built around "Matilda," a vast electromechanical computer that maintains a comprehensive national database of all US citizens' records and interactions. Thornberg is a veteran of the Brazilian war and considered politically reliable by the regime, but something in him snaps when his nephew is sent to a concentration camp and shortly thereafter murdered. In a minor act of rebellion, he uses his unrestricted access to Matilda to fabricate the existence of a small-time anti-government militant, whom he names "Sam Hall" after the angry folk song of the same name, and begins inserting false evidence of Hall's involvement into the records of real crimes. After a brewing anti-regime underground — whose attacks are becoming more brazen and frequent — starts to use the Sam Hall identity, the fictional rebel becomes a household name.

Unable to obtain any independently verifiable information on Hall, the government begins to suspect internal subversion and grows increasingly paranoid; meanwhile, the rebels emerge into the open and launch a full-scale civil war, billed as the "Third American Revolution." Thornberg takes advantage of the worsening chaos by inserting incriminating fabrications into the records of senior regime personnel, hoping to sow distrust among the ranks and bring down the government before it can recall its Venusian garrison troops — which include his son — to reinforce Earth. With the regime paralyzed and disintegrating, soldiers arrive at the Matilda base to arrest Thornberg, who is by this point himself unsure whether his treason has finally been discovered or whether he has merely been randomly implicated in one of his own fabricated witch-hunts. He forces the troops to surrender with a dead-man switch he has wired to an EMP that would wipe all the data stored in Matilda.

In an epilogue, Thornberg asks a rebel officer what will be done with Matilda; the man assures him it will be destroyed once the war ends, as the underground believes that a government with the ability to conduct this level of surveillance against its population is incompatible with democracy.

Sequel

In 1964, Anderson produced a loose sequel in the short novel Three Worlds to Conquer, set on a US prison colony on Ganymede during the rebellion on Earth.

Reception

In 2004, the story was a finalist for the 1954 Retro-Hugo award for Best Novelette. In 2014, the story was a finalist for the Prometheus Award Hall of Fame. The story won the Prometheus Hall of Fame Award in 2020.

James E. Gunn has said that the story shows how computers are vulnerable to unreliable data, while Strange Horizons considers the story to be "as much (...) social commentary as science fiction".

References

Short stories by Poul Anderson
Science fiction short stories